The STATS FCS Offensive Player of the Year award has been awarded annually by STATS LLC since 2015 to the most outstanding offensive collegiate football player in the NCAA Division I Football Championship Subdivision. The winner is selected by a national panel of sports information and media relations directors, broadcasters, writers and other dignitaries.

Winners

Winners by school

References

College football national player awards
Awards established in 2015